The year 1914 was marked, in science fiction, by the following events.

Births and deaths

Births 
 November 7 : Raphael Aloysius Lafferty, American writer (died 2002)

Deaths

Events

Awards 
The main science-fiction Awards known at the present time did not exist at this time.

Literary releases

Novels 
  Paris in Fire, novel by Henri Barbot.

Stories collections

Short stories

Comics

Audiovisual outputs

Movies

See also 
 1914 in science
 1913 in science fiction
 1915 in science fiction

References

science-fiction
Science fiction by year